Dr. Edgar Knobloch (11 November 1927 – 3 February 2013) was a Czech writer who specialised in the history of Central Asia and the Islamic world. He studied Middle Eastern history at the Charles University and the Oriental Institute in Prague. He travelled extensively and first visited Central Asia in 1959. He became a fellow of the Royal Geographical Society in 1999.

Selected publications

Czech and Russian language works 
 Kulja (s Richardem Blahou, Prešov, 1960, rusky)
 V srdci Ázie (1961, slovensky)
 V srdci Asie (první vydání SNDK 1962, česky)
 Kurdská noc (Jean-Richard Bloch; Edgar Knobloch; Vladimír Brett, SNKLU, 1963, česky)
 V zemi pouští a hor: výstava fotografií ze Sovětské Střední Asie (s Miloš Hrbas; Náprstkovo Muzeum Asijských, Afrických  Amerických kultur, 1964, katalog, česky)
 Stesky (Joachim Du Bellay; Edgar Knobloch; Jan Vladislav, SNKLU, 1964, česky)
 Smrt Tamerlánova (první vydání 1965, Triton, 2003, česky)
 Putování k Mongolům (Johannes de Plano Carpini.; Willelmus de Rubruk.; Ruy Gonzales de Clavijo, SNKLU, 1964, česky)
 Umění Střední Asie (s Milošem Hrbasem, SNKLU, 1965, česky)
 Encyklopedie umění středověku (René Huyghe, první vydání Odeon, 1969, česky)
 Turkestan : Taschkent, Buchara, Samarkand : Reisen zu den Kulturatätten Mittelasiens (s Peter de Mendelssohn, Prestel-Verlag, 1973, München; London; New York: Prestel, 1999, německy)
 Strach (s Věrou Martinkovou, Alfa-Omega, 2001, česky)
 Návrat nežádoucí (Alfa Omega, 2002, česky)
 Roztroušená rodinka a jiné rozmarné veršíky (Alfa-Omega, 2003, česky)
 Klec (Triton, 2003, česky)
 Sněhurka a čtrnáct trpaslíků (Alfa Omega 2007, česky)
 Nomádi a Rusové (Triton, 2008, česky)
 Cizinec z povolání (Alfa-Omega, 2009, česky)

English language works 
 The art of Central Asia. Paul Hamlyn, London, 1965.
 Beyond the Oxus: Archaeology, art & architecture of Central Asia. Benn, London, 1972. 
 Baedeker's Netherlands, Belgium & Luxembourg. Prentice Hall, 1984. (co-author)
 Monuments of Central Asia: A guide to the archaeology, art and architecture of Turkestan. I. B. Tauris, London, 2001. 
 The archaeology and architecture of Afghanistan. The History Press, Stroud, 2002. 
 Russia & Asia: Nomadic & oriental traditions in Russian history. Odyssey Publications, 2007. 
 Treasures of the great Silk Road. The History Press, Stroud, 2012.

See also 
Luce Boulnois

References 

1927 births
2013 deaths
Czech male writers
Charles University alumni
Writers from Prague
20th-century Czech historians
Fellows of the Royal Geographical Society
21st-century Czech historians